Low pressure baroreceptors are baroreceptors that relay information derived from blood pressure within the autonomic nervous system. They are stimulated by stretching of the vessel wall. They are located in large systemic veins and in the walls of the atria of the heart, and pulmonary vasculature. Low pressure baroreceptors are also referred to as volume receptors and cardiopulmonary baroreceptors.

Structure 
There are two types of cardiopulmonary baroreceptors. Type A receptors and Type B receptors are both within the atria of the heart. Type A receptors are activated by wall tension, which develops by atrial contraction during ventricular diastole. Type B receptors are activated by wall stretch, which develops by atrial filling during ventricular systole.  In the right atrium, the stretch receptors occur at the junction of the venae cavae. In the left atrium, the junction is at the pulmonary veins.

Function 
Low pressure baroreceptors are involved in regulation of the blood volume. The blood volume determines the mean pressure throughout the system, especially venous side where most of the blood is held. Low pressure baroreceptors have both circulatory and renal effects, which produce changes in hormone secretion. These secretions can effect the retention of salt and water as well as influencing the intake of salt and water within the kidneys. The renal will allow the receptors to change the longer-term mean pressure.

Through the vagal nerve, impulses transmits from the atria to the vagal center of the medulla. This causes a reduction in the sympathetic outflow the kidney, which results in decreased renal blood flow and decreased urine output. This same sympathetic outflow is increased to the sinus node in the atria, which causes increased heart rate/cardiac output. These cardiopulmonary receptors also inhibits vagal stimulation in the vasoconstrictor center of the medulla resulting in decreased release of angiotensin, aldosterone, and vasopressin.[1]

See also

 Bainbridge reflex
 High pressure receptors
 Atrial volume receptors

References

Sensory receptors